Mumtaz Mahal was the wife of Shah Jahan, an emperor of the Mughal Empire

It may also mean:
 Mumtaz Mahal (Red Fort)
 Mumtaz Mahal (horse): Thoroughbred racehorse and broodmare
 Mumtaz Mahal (film): a 1944 Hindi film
 Mumtaz Mahal (album): album